Lakhipur Assembly constituency (Bengali: লখিপুর বিধানসভা সমষ্টি) is one of the 126 state legislative assembly constituencies in Assam state in North Eastern India. It is also one of the 7 state legislative assembly constituencies included in the Silchar Lok Sabha constituency.

Members of Legislative Assembly

Election results

2021 results

2016 results

2014 results

See also
Cachar district
Lakhipur

References

External links 
 

Assembly constituencies of Assam